Yifa (born 1959) is a Taiwanese scholar and writer and the founder of the organization, Woodenfish Foundation. She is a nun ordained in 1979 by Fo Guang Shan, a Buddhist organization in Taiwan. Yifa holds a law degree from the National Taiwan University, a masters in comparative philosophy from the University of Hawaii, and a doctorate in religious studies from Yale University. She served as a department head and dean of University of the West during her tenure at the college.

Career
Yifa has participated in many interfaith dialogues such as the Gethsemani Encounter and contributed to the UNICEF South Asia's Safe Motherhood Project. She is also the current director of the Woodenfish program for college students.

In 2003, Yifa was awarded an Outstanding Women in Buddhism Award. In October 2006, she was honored at the 9th Annual Juliet Hollister Awards Ceremony, which was held at the United Nations Headquarters. Yifa was recognized along with Wall Street Journal reporter Daniel Pearl, who was honored posthumously.

Venerable Yifa has also been involved in translating sutras from Mandarin to English.  Since 2006, Yifa and others have published translations of the Heart Sutra, Diamond Sutra, Kṣitigarbha Bodhisattva Pūrvapraṇidhāna Sūtra and the Amitabha Sutra.
Yifa is based in Beijing, China and travels often to meet with scholars and members of the global Buddhist community.

List of books
Authenticity: Clearing the Junk, A Buddhist Perspective 
The Tender Heart: A Buddhist Response to Suffering 
Discernment: Educating the Mind and Spirit 
Safeguarding the Heart: A Buddhist Response to Suffering and September 11
The Origins of Buddhist Monastic Codes in China: An Annotated Translation and Study of the Chanyuan Qinggui

Yifa has also co-authored Benedict's Dharma: Buddhists Reflect On the Role of St. Benedict, along with Norman Fischer, Joseph Goldstein, Judith Simmer-Brown, David Steindl-Rast, and editor Patrick J. Henry.

See also
Fo Guang Shan
Hsing Yun
Woodenfish Foundation

External links
The Woodenfish Program official website
Interview with Danny Fisher about her latest book, "Junk"

References

University of Hawaiʻi alumni
Buddhist writers
Buddhist studies scholars
1959 births
Living people
Fo Guang Shan Buddhists
Taiwanese Buddhist nuns
Zen Buddhist nuns
National Taiwan University alumni
Yale Graduate School of Arts and  Sciences alumni
People from Hacienda Heights, California
20th-century Buddhist nuns
21st-century Buddhist nuns